This is an incomplete list of Tamil television soap operas, broadcast on nationwide networks Sun TV, STAR Vijay, Kalaignar TV, Zee Tamil, Jaya TV, Raj TV, Polimer TV, Puthuyugam TV, Vendhar TV, Mega TV, Makkal TV, DD Podhigai, Captain TV, Vasanth TV, Shakthi TV, Vasantham TV, Nethra TV, MediaCorp Vasantham, Astro Vaanavil, Astro Vinmeen HD, IBC Tamil, Global Tamil Vision, and Deepam TV.

By debut year

2023

0–9

A

B

C

D

E

G

I

J

K

L

M

N

O

P

R

S

T

U

V

Y

See also
 List of programs broadcast by Sun TV (India)
 List of programs broadcast by Zee Tamil (India)
 List of programs broadcast by Star Vijay
 List of programs broadcast by Kalaignar TV
 List of programs broadcast by Puthuyugam TV
 List of programs broadcast by Raj TV
 List of programs broadcast by Shakthi TV
 List of programmes broadcast by Colors Tamil
 List of programs broadcast by Polimer TV

References

Soap
+